Philedonides is a genus of moths belonging to the subfamily Tortricinae of the family Tortricidae.

Species
Philedonides lunana (Thunberg & Borgström, 1784)
Philedonides rhombicana (Herrich-Schäffer, 1851)
Philedonides seeboldiana (Rössler, 1877)

See also
List of Tortricidae genera

References

External links
tortricidae.com

Archipini
Tortricidae genera